Betio is the largest township of Kiribati's capital city, South Tarawa, and the country's main port. The settlement is located on a separate islet at the extreme southwest of the atoll.

Betio Post Office opened on 5 April 1957 and closed in 1964. In 1967, the Marine Training Centre was created by Hamburg Süd. John Hilary Smith, governor of the Gilbert and Ellice Islands created the Betio Town Council in 1972. Since the 1970s, the islet has become a major centre of economic activity in Kiribati, and a causeway to Bairiki was constructed in the early 1980s, leading to an increase in human contact with the island. Due to changing currents resulting from the construction of the causeway, Bikeman Island, northeast of Betio, has been submerged since the early 1990s.

Pacific War

The island was the scene of the Battle of Tarawa during World War II. Relics of the Japanese invasion, and the subsequent American assault on the islet in 1943, remain there. After the battle the airstrip was renamed Hawkins Field. The airstrip no longer exists, but its effect can be seen in the stunted growth of palms along its length. Many bunkers remain, as well as the remains of military equipment.

It was also the scene of a massacre by beheading of New Zealand military and civilian coastwatchers by Japanese forces prior to the US landings. The massacre was in retaliation to an American air raid.

Before the massacre, seamen and civil servants who were housed on the island escaped in a small, open launch, towing a lifeboat. They sailed to Nonouti, in the Southern Gilberts, where they were met by the Degei, commanded by Captain G. J. (Jack) Webster in which they returned from Nonouti to Fiji. News of the massacre was covered up by British authorities at the time to the extent that New Zealand and Fijian governments were prevented from informing the families of the men killed of their deaths. However, persistent rumours eventually reached the families, and it is believed that the shooting of Japanese prisoners held in a New Zealand POW camp was done in retaliation for this massacre. The New Zealand camp guard who fired on the Japanese prisoners during the prison riot was the brother of one of the coastwatchers executed on Betio.

The partly submerged hulk of the Saidu Maru, a Japanese merchant ship often mistaken for the Nimanoa, would later be used as a machine gun post by the Japanese against the US forces that re-took Tarawa. The RCS Nimanoa was a wooden-hulled ketch, whereas Saidu Maru was a steel-hulled vessel, part of which is still visible on the reef off Red Beach.

Unexploded artillery shells, mortar rounds, anti-aircraft shells and live machine gun bullets left over from the Second World War are littered throughout the island and surrounding reef, as well as the remains of several hundred U.S. and Japanese soldiers. The remains of 30 U.S. soldiers and Marines were discovered in March 2019.

References 

South Tarawa